Pesta Perdana is a prestigious award show from Singapore, honoring the best local media talent. This yearly event draws entries from programming channels and production houses all across the island, vying for top honors, in the fiercely contested categories. The award show is televised and broadcast 'live' every year since 2001.

Pesta Perdana is produced by Mediacorp, and hence attracts large numbers of celebrities - local, regional and international. The show is aired domestically on MediaCorp Suria and internationally by Channel News Asia International.

References

Singaporean television series